Robert Stansfield, Stansfeld or Stanfield may refer to:

Fictional characters
 Robert Stansfield, character from the film The Family (2013)
 Robert Stansfield, character from the comic Hotell (2020)

People
 Robert H. Stansfield, American Attorney and Georgia Superior Court Judge Candidate
 Robert Timothy Stansfield Frankford (1939–2015), Canadian politician

 Charles Robert Stansfeld Jones (1886–1950), English accountant, occultist and ceremonial magician

 Robert Lorne Stanfield (1914–2003), Canadian politician, Leader of the Progressive Conservative Party (1967–1976)
 Robert Nelson Stanfield (1877–1945), American politician and Senator for Oregon (1921–1927)

Places
 Robert L. Stanfield International Airport, Nova Scotia, Canada

See also
 Stansfield (surname)
 Stansfield (disambiguation)
 Stansfeld (surname)
 Stanfield (surname)
 Standfield